is a Japanese soap opera series created by Yumiko Inoue. She wrote the screenplay based on her own experiences of her father being in hospital. Maki Horikita played the lead role as a nurse. It premiered on TBS on 13 January 2015, and concluded 17 March 2015, airing 10 episodes.

Cast
 Maki Horikita as Akari Arimura, a nurse who wants to marry a wealthy man
 Yūya Yagira as Kōtarō Nakano, a young surgeon who studied cutting-edge medicine in the United States
 Mirai Shida as Nana Matsuoka, Arimura's nurse colleague
 Rin Takanashi as Yūko Wada, Arimura's nurse colleague
 Ken Ishiguro as Masataka Satō, a director of the Tōō hospital surgical center
 Miki Mizuno as Megumi Iwabuchi, a veteran nurse
 Tae Kimura as Shizuka Tanoshima, a head nurse

Episodes

References

External links
  
 
  
 

Japanese drama television series
2015 in Japanese television
2015 Japanese television series debuts
2015 Japanese television series endings
TBS Television (Japan) dramas
Television shows written by Yumiko Inoue